Heartstrings is the debut studio album by Japanese novelty heavy metal band Aisenshi, released through Metallic Core on June 5, 2013. Released as the spiritual successor to lead vocalist Eizo Sakamoto's previous band Animetal, the album features metal covers of various anime theme songs.

The album peaked at No. 296 on Oricon's weekly albums chart.

Track listing

Personnel
 – lead vocals
 – lead guitar
Hiro – bass
Katsuji – drums

Charts

References

External links

2013 debut albums
Japanese-language albums
Covers albums